Hanspeter Burri (born 22 December 1963) is a retired Swiss football defender.

References

1963 births
Living people
Swiss men's footballers
FC Luzern players
Swiss Super League players
Association football defenders
Switzerland international footballers